The Bishop of Woolwich is an episcopal title used by an area bishop of the Church of England Diocese of Southwark, in the Province of Canterbury, England.

The title takes its name after Woolwich, a suburb of the Royal Borough of Greenwich. Two of the best known former bishops are John A. T. Robinson, who was a major figure in Liberal Christianity, and David Sheppard, the former Sussex and England cricketer who went on to become the Anglican Bishop of Liverpool. The bishops suffragan of Woolwich have been area bishops since the Southwark area scheme was founded in 1991.

The incumbent is Karowei Dorgu, since his episcopal consecration on 17 March 2017.

List of bishops

References

External links
 Crockford's Clerical Directory - Listings

 
Anglican suffragan bishops in the Diocese of Southwark